Vicenza railway station  serves the town and comune of Vicenza, in the Veneto region, northeastern Italy.  Opened in 1846, it forms part of the Milan–Venice railway, and is also a junction of two branch lines, to Schio and Treviso, respectively.

The station is currently owned by Rete Ferroviaria Italiana (RFI).  The commercial area of the passenger building is managed by Centostazioni.  Train services to and from the station are operated by Trenitalia.  Each of these companies is a subsidiary of Ferrovie dello Stato (FS), Italy's state-owned rail company.

Features
The station has a large passenger building that houses many facilities for passengers, the headquarters of the Railway Police, and the offices of Trenitalia and the station management.

The six through platforms at the station are numbered from 1 to 6.  At the far eastern end of the station, there are also two bay platforms (1 Giardino and 2 Giardino), at which trains arrive from and depart to Schio and Treviso.  In total, there are eight platform tracks for passengers, plus some tracks for the exclusive use of goods handling, manoeuvering, stabling and storage.

The station is equipped with a locomotive depot, and a short distance away there are major repair shops.

Train services
The following services call at the station: +39 0444 223115

High speed services (Frecciabianca) Turin - Milan - Verona - Padua - Venice - Trieste
High speed services (Frecciabianca) Milan - Verona - Padua - Venice - Treviso - Udine
High speed services (Frecciabianca) Milan - Verona - Vicenza - Treviso - Udine
Intercity services (EuroCity) Geneva - Lausanne - Brig - Milan - Verona - Padua - Venice
Intercity services (EuroCity) Munich - Innsbruck - Verona - Padua - Venice
Express services (Regionale Veloce) Verona - Vicenza - Padua - VeniceExpress services ( Regionale Veloce ) Verona - Padua - Venice - Latisana
Regional services (Treno regionale) Verona - Vicenza - Padua - VeniceRegional services (Treno regionale) Vicenza - Citadella - Castelfranco Veneto - TrevisoLocal services (Treno regionale) Vicenza - SchioRenovations
Work on upgrading and enhancement of the entire structure of the station building is currently being completed.  The work is financed by an investment of approximately 2.4 million euros by Centostazioni and RFI. To achieve a uniform appearance and enhance the main facades, the front and sides of the building have received a veneer of brick and Vicenza yellow stone.

In addition to the retrofitting of existing facilities, and removal of architectural barriers (with the laying of a new path for the vision-impaired), the station has been equipped with new shopping facilities.  The previously existing businesses (bar/pizzeria, a tobacconist, newsagent and bank with door ATM) have been joined by a bookshop (Libreria Mondadori), a perfume shop/convenience store (Schlecker), a phone shop (Smartphone), a costume jewellery shop (4You), a clothing store (Fila), another shop (Zippo), an insurance office and a car rental agency (Major).

Passenger and train movements
The station has about 7.7 million passenger movements each year.

Gallery

References

External links

CentoStazioni: Information about Vicenza railway station 
History and pictures of Vicenza railway station This article is based upon a translation of the Italian language version as at December 2010.''

Railway stations in Veneto
Buildings and structures in Vicenza
Railway stations opened in 1846
Railway stations in Italy opened in 1846